The following is a list of events affecting American television in 2018. Events listed include television show finales and cancellations and information about controversies and carriage disputes.

Notable events

January

February

March

April

May

June

July

August

September

October

November

December

Awards

Television programs

Programs debuting in 2018

Television films and specials

These television films and specials are scheduled to premiere in 2018. The premiere dates may be changed depending on a variety of factors.

Miniseries

Programs changing networks

Programs returning in 2018

The following shows will return with new episodes after being canceled, ended their run previously, or underwent a hiatus that lasted at least one year:

Milestone episodes

Programs ending in 2018

Entering syndication in 2018
A list of programs (current or canceled) that have accumulated enough episodes (between 65 and 100) or seasons (three or more) to be eligible for off-network syndication and/or basic cable runs.

Networks, services, and television stations

Deaths

References

External links 
List of 2018 American television series at IMDb

 
American television